Chui may refer to:

Surname
 Chui (surname)
 Cui (surname), Cantonese Chinese surname

Places
In Kyrgyzstan:
Chüy Region
Chu (river) (also known as Chüy)

In South America:
The contiguous towns of 
Chuí, in Rio Grande do Sul, Brazil
Chuy, in Rocha Department, Uruguay
Chuí Stream, on the Brazil-Uruguay border

Other
Chuí (Chinese weapon)
An affectionate nickname for those with Jesus in their names

See also
Chuy (disambiguation)
Choi (disambiguation)